Shimlapuri is an area in Ludhiana city in Punjab, India. It has a small scale industry, but is large in size. It is along Sidhwan Canal and includes both residential and industrial buildings. Postal pin code is 141003. 

Ward-wise list of Councilors

Ludhiana
Neighbourhoods in Punjab, India